Francisco de Ribera was a Spanish Franciscan priest from Toledo, a Doctor of Theology, whom Pope Sixtus V appointed as bishop of Leighlin, Ireland, on 14 September 1587. Leighlin being under English control at this time, Ribera resided in the Irish College in Antwerp, where he built an infirmary. He died in Antwerp on 10 September 1604.

References

16th-century births
1604 deaths
Franciscan bishops
Spanish Franciscans
Bishops of Leighlin